New Wave Rides was an American manufacturer of water rides.  They manufactured water slides and water slide complexes.

History
From 1975 - 1981, Bill Crandall was the general manager of AstroWorld. In 1979, Crandall partnered with Intamin to create the first river rapids ride, Thunder River. After the ride's debut season, 1980, was complete, Crandall decided to start his own consulting business, Crandall & Associates. In January 1984, his company had been contracted to supervise Frontier City amusement park. They developed a water slide attraction called Riptide, which was installed in the park in the fall of 1984. In November 1984, Crandall & Associates founded New Wave Rides, with Riptide as its debut attraction. The company sold its second ride, called Thunder Falls, to Frontier City, which opened in 1985.

Partial List of Attractions

Operating

Closed

References

Amusement ride manufacturers
Companies based in Grapevine, Texas
Manufacturing companies based in Texas